Pyrausta tripunctalis is a moth in the family Crambidae. It was described by Paul Dognin in 1908. It is found in Peru.

References

Moths described in 1908
tripunctalis
Moths of South America